Adarshnagar railway station is a small railway station in Ajmer district, Rajasthan India. Its code is AHO. It serves Ajmer city. The station consists of two platforms. The platforms are not well sheltered. It lacks many facilities including water and sanitation.

Adarshnagar located near Ajmer Junction railway station which is at an important railway junction on the broad-gauge Jaipur–Ahmedabad line. The rail lines on this route are without electric wires means only Diesel engines can be run on them. Electrification of the railway lines is under progress, starting with Ajmer–Jaipur line.

Major trains 

 Ajmer–Udaipur Passenger

References

Railway stations in Ajmer district
Ajmer railway division
Transport in Ajmer
Buildings and structures in Ajmer